Yenibardak is a village in the Gerger District, Adıyaman Province, Turkey. The village is populated by Kurds of the Barmaz tribe and had a population of 471 in 2021.

The hamlets of Aydoğdu, Ekinlik, Güneypınar, Kırmızıgül, Kırmızıtarla and Şahkulu are attached to the village.

References

Villages in Gerger District
Kurdish settlements in Adıyaman Province